Beta Technologies (stylized as BETA Technologies), is a Burlington, Vermont-based aerospace manufacturer developing electric vertical take off and landing (eVTOL) aircraft for the cargo and logistics industry. The company has also developed a network of specially designed charging infrastructure to support their aircraft, it addition to pilot training for future electric aircraft pilots.

The company was founded by Kyle Clark in 2017.

History 

BETA Technologies was incorporated in 2017 in Burlington, Vermont by Kyle Clark, an experienced pilot, engineer and entrepreneur. In order to become the company's first test pilot, he learned to fly helicopters, and earned FAA qualifications for a powered lift rating.

The company identified its first customer as United Therapeutics, which under founder and CEO Martine Rothblatt was looking for efficient transportation methods for organs  intended for human transplant. United Therapeutics awarded BETA a $48 million contract.

On May 23, 2018, the company made the first tethered flight of its original 4,000 lb (1,800 kg) Ava XC eight motor, eight propeller battery-operated proof of concept aircraft.

The company came out of stealth in January 2019. That year, the Ava XC became the world’s heaviest eVTOL aircraft to fly.

In February 2020, the company began participating in the United States Air Force Agility Prime program that seeks to advance electric air mobility. In May, the Air Force Life Cycle Management Center announced that the company, along with Joby Aviation, would progress to the third phase of the program. In June, the company unveiled its second aircraft prototype, ALIA-250.

In March 2021, the ALIA-250 made a test flight from Plattsburgh, New York, across Lake Champlain to Burlington, Vermont. In April, United Parcel Service (UPS) entered into a contract for ten ALIA-250 aircraft to be supplied in 2024, which included the option for UPS to acquire up to 150 more aircraft. UPS announced it planned to have them travel directly to and from UPS facilities, rather than use airports. In April, Blade Urban Air Mobility ordered 20 ALIA aircraft, becoming BETA's first passenger service company. In May, the U.S. Air Force's Public Affairs office announced that BETA Technologies was granted the Air Force’s first airworthiness certificate as a part of the AFWERX Agility Prime program, allowing the military to begin using the company's aircraft for test flights. Also in May, the company announced it was building a 270,000 square-foot manufacturing facility at the Burlington International Airport, with a planned production capacity of 400 EV aircraft per year. In July, the company completed a 205 mile crewed flight of its aircraft, its longest flight up to that point.

The company announced on January 31, 2022 that it had won a U.S. Army contract to support flight testing of its Alia electric vertical takeoff and landing aircraft.  The partnership eventually aims to help the Army test specific military cargo and logistics missions for eVTOLs, while allowing Beta to accelerate development for both military and civil applications.  Initially, Army engineers and Beta’s team plan to evaluate how Alia might best be applied to specific missions by measuring its range, altitude, endurance, and payload limits.

Technology 

eVTOL aircraft can take off and land directly on a customer's site, allowing smaller loads to be delivered directly to recipients instead of having to fly feeder airplanes into airports or using ground delivery. 

The company uses electric motors as they are reportedly quieter and have a smaller carbon footprint with zero operational emissions compared to an equivalent gasoline engine, and require less maintenance. The company claims they are also more efficient than combustion engines and have constant torque across all speeds, which enables control without helicopter-like complexity.

Products
BETA Technologies develops eVTOL aircraft and a network of charging stations to support them. 

ALIA-250 - BETA Technologies' second prototype is designed to charge in under an hour, and carry six passengers or cargo for up to 250 nautical miles (nmi), which is the basis for the model number. Its wing design was inspired by the arctic tern, a migratory bird known for its long flights.Its zero emission engines provide separate lift and thrust, as opposed to the tilt-rotor design of AVA, with a maximum range of 250 nm at a weight of 6,000 lbs and a cruise speed of 170 miles per hour.  

Charging infrastructure - BETA developed and prototyped charging stations for eVTOL aircraft made from recycled shipping containers and reused airplane batteries. The stations can be solar or grid powered and are customizable to an individual location with additional modules, such as storage, overnight lodging, and for maintenance. The stations reportedly recharge an aircraft battery in less than an hour, and can be fitted with recycled airplane batteries to allow electric ground fleet charging.
CX300 - The CX300 is an all-electric conventional take-off and landing aircraft that is designed to charge in under an hour, and can be used in passenger, cargo, medical, or military configurations. The aircraft is powered by one rear-mounted pusher motor and its lift is created by the same 50-ft wing.

Finances 
Reportedly secured in March 2021, BETA Technologies raised $143 million in venture funding from undisclosed sources. Announced on May 18, 2021, BETA raised $368 million in Series A financing, with Fidelity Management & Research leading the round alongside investors Redbird Capital and Amazon's Climate Pledge Fund. 

In April 2022, BETA announced they had raised an additional $375 million in Series B financing led by TPG Rise Climate and Fidelity Management & Research alongside Amazon's Climate Pledge Fund.

See also 

 Electric aircraft
 VTOL

References

External links 

 Official website
 
Aircraft manufacturers of the United States
VTOL aircraft
Electric aircraft
Companies based in Vermont